Juro Mětšk (1 May 1954 – 20 January 2022) was a Sorbian composer.

Life and career 
Born in Bautzen, the son of the Sorbian writer and publicist , he studied at the Hochschule für Musik Hanns Eisler Berlin until 1976, and was a teacher at a music school from 1976 to 1980. From 1980 to 1983, he completed master studies at the Academy of Arts, Berlin with Reiner Bredemeyer. In 1985, he received the Hans Stieber Prize as part of the Hallische Musiktage.

His work Syndrom was awarded a prize at the 1989 competition Forum junger Komponisten of the Westdeutscher Rundfunk.

Mětšk died in Herrnhut on 20 January 2022, at the age of 67.

Works 
Source:

 accents antiques for string quartet, 1975
 musica da camera, 1978/79
 Psychogramme for Orchestra
 SESTETTO
 Canti per Violoncello e Piano
 trio…torso…alla…rondo…alla…torso…
 mit groteskem riesenbogen … trüb ein pizzicato for viola solo, 1984
 KONTRAKTION“ Kontra-aktionen für kammerensemble, 1988.
 syndrom for chamber ensemble
 Retour pour grande orchestra

References

Further reading 
 Mětšk, Juro. In: Wilfried W. Bruchhäuser: Komponisten der Gegenwart im Deutschen Komponisten-Interessenverband. Ein Handbuch. 4th edition, Deutscher Komponisten-Interessenverband, Berlin 1995, .
 Mětšk, Juro. In Axel Schniederjürgen (ed.): Kürschners Musiker-Handbuch. 5th edition, K. G. Saur Verlag, Munich 2006, .

External links 
 Juro Mětšk in the Archive of Contemporary Composers of the Saxon State and University Library Dresden
 
 

1954 births
2022 deaths
20th-century classical composers
21st-century classical composers
Sorbian people
People from Bautzen